iRT Racing was an American UCI Continental cycling team established in 2015.  The team disbanded prior to the 2016 season.

The team was owned by Ray Asante and Lynn Perrando.

References

UCI Continental Teams (America)
Cycling teams established in 2015
Cycling teams based in the United States
2015 establishments in the United States